is a Japanese football player.

Playing career
Hamaguchi was born in Kochi Prefecture on May 22, 1999. He joined J2 League club Kamatamare Sanuki from youth team in 2018. On June 6, he debuted against Yokohama FC in Emperor's Cup.

References

External links

1999 births
Living people
Association football people from Kōchi Prefecture
Japanese footballers
J2 League players
J3 League players
Kamatamare Sanuki players
Association football midfielders